Alexander Hall Roe (1842 – July 12, 1884) was an Ontario merchant and political figure. He represented Lennox in the Legislative Assembly of Ontario as a Conservative member from 1883 to 1884.

He was born in Westport, Frontenac County in 1842 and studied at Victoria College in Cobourg. He studied law in Napanee but then moved to Forest Mills where he operated a general store, a sawmill and a gristmill. He returned to the study of law at Napanee and, although he never qualified as an attorney, was employed in the practice of general law. He was defeated by George Douglas Hawley in the 1879 general election but then won the Lennox seat in 1883. He died in office in 1884.

External links 

History of the County of Lennox and Addington, WS Herrington (1913)

1842 births
1884 deaths
Progressive Conservative Party of Ontario MPPs